Grif may refer to:

 Dexter Grif, a character in Red vs. Blue
 Grifball a Halo gametype named after the character
 Grif Italia, an Italian hang glider manufacturer
 O-aminophenol oxidase, an enzyme referred to as GriF
 Grif Teller (1899–1993), artist famous for his paintings for the Pennsylvania Railroad

See also 
 Griff (disambiguation)